Malcolm in the Middle is an American sitcom created by Linwood Boomer for Fox. The series premiered on January 9, 2000, and ended on May 14, 2006, after seven seasons and 151 episodes.

The series is a dark humored family comedy that follows a dysfunctional lower-middle-class family and stars Frankie Muniz in the lead role as Malcolm, a child prodigy. The ensemble cast includes Jane Kaczmarek and Bryan Cranston as Malcolm's parents, Lois and Hal. Christopher Kennedy Masterson, Justin Berfield, and Erik Per Sullivan appear as Malcolm's brothers, Francis, Reese, and Dewey. Typical plots revolve around the family's dysfunctional relationships and inability to fit into society, with Malcolm regularly making asides to the camera to comment on their failures. Another brother, Jamie (James and Lukas Rodriguez), was introduced as the fifth son of Hal and Lois at the end of season four. The show was notable for its pop punk influences and portrayal of 2000s youth culture.

Malcolm in the Middle was produced by Satin City and Regency Television in association with Fox 21 Television Studios (now known as Touchstone Television). The show has been syndicated worldwide.

The show received widespread acclaim from critics and proved a popular draw for Fox. It is placed on several lists of the greatest TV and sitcom series of all time. It has won a Peabody Award, seven Emmy Awards, one Grammy Award and seven Golden Globe nominations.

Premise
The series revolves around an 11-year-old boy named Malcolm (Frankie Muniz), who is revealed in the first episode to be a genius with an IQ of 165, which places him in a class for gifted students (also known as "Krelboynes"), originally taught by Caroline Miller (Catherine Lloyd Burns). He is the third-born child in a comically dysfunctional family of four (later five) boys, 
of Lois (Jane Kaczmarek) and Hal (Bryan Cranston). As of the first season, their delinquent oldest child, 15-year-old Francis (Christopher Kennedy Masterson), has been sent away to military school, while his brothers 12-year-old Reese (Justin Berfield), Malcolm and 6-year-old Dewey (Erik Per Sullivan) remain at home with their parents. With Francis away, Malcolm becomes the middle child of the family. In season four, the character Jamie (James and Lukas Rodriguez) was added to the show as the fifth son of Hal and Lois. The show's early seasons centered on Malcolm dealing with the rigors of being an intellectual and enduring the eccentricities of family life.

Later seasons expanded the show's scope by exploring the family's interactions with their extended family, friends and colleagues in more depth, including Lois' tyrannical mother (Cloris Leachman); Craig Feldspar (David Anthony Higgins), Lois' hapless coworker at the Lucky Aide drugstore; Malcolm's best friend Stevie Kenarban (Craig Lamar Traylor) (who is both a wheelchair user and highly asthmatic), and Stevie's dad Abe (Gary Anthony Williams); as well as a series of continuing subplots detailing Francis' misadventures at the military academy, from which he subsequently disenrols to work in an Alaskan logging camp, before finally landing a job on a dude ranch run by an eccentric German couple.

The series differed significantly from the standard TV sitcom presentation commonplace at the time. Malcolm routinely broke the fourth wall by both narrating in voice-over and talking directly to the viewer on camera. The distinctive look and sound of the series relied heavily on elaborate post-production, including fast-cut editing, sound effects, musical inserts, the extensive use of locations, and the unusual camera styles, compositions and effects (e.g. overhead, tracking, hand-held and crane shots, and the frequent use of a wide-angle lens for both close-ups and ensemble scenes) that would be generally impractical or impossible to achieve in a standard studio-based video multi-camera sitcom production. The show employed neither a laugh track (which was standard in other TV sitcoms) nor a live studio audience. Emulating the style of hour-long dramas, this half-hour show was shot on film instead of on video.

Another distinctive aspect of the show is that the cold open of every episode is unrelated to the main story. Exceptions were episodes which were the conclusions of "two-parters"; each part two episode opened with a recap of its part one episode.

The family's surname is never mentioned directly in the series. Linwood Boomer's script for the pilot episode originally included the surname Wilkerson, but it was later removed because he did not want to put "any specific ethnic label on the characters". The surname appeared in early drafts of promotional material and also on Francis' Marlin Academy uniform in the pilot. In the last episode of the series, "Graduation", Francis drops his ID badge from his new office job, which lists his name as "Francis Nolastname". Also, in that same episode, the principal announces Malcolm as the speaker, mouthing "Nolastname" as his voice is drowned out by microphone feedback. A publicist for Fox said that "officially the family's last name should be considered a mystery". The last name "Wilkerson" was occasionally referenced in foreign marketing for the show, in particular British TV advertisements and the DVD insert from the Region 2 release of season five in the description of the episode "Block Party".

It is also never made explicit where the show takes place. Several episodes hint that the family resides somewhere in the American Southwest, such as showing the family living within driving distance of Las Vegas. At other times, facts about where the family lives are intentionally contradictory given the climate and what is described to be nearby.

Characters 

 Malcolm (played by Frankie Muniz) is the title character of the series. Malcolm is a genius with an IQ of 165 and a photographic memory. He is placed in a class for gifted student (or "Krelboynes" as they are known at the school). His high intelligence, as well as feelings of not fitting in, and a large ego fueled by a cruel streak of snarkiness cause numerous problems for him over the course of the series. As the title suggests, Malcolm is initially the middle child of the three living at home; chronologically, he is Hal's and Lois' third son. Despite his intelligence, Malcolm is just as immature and destructive as his brothers and is often the ringleader in some of their schemes. Throughout the show, Malcolm often strives for independence away from his controlling mother and often tries to have her see him as an equal. Due to his intelligence, Lois often makes decisions that she feels will benefit his education while keeping a close eye on him. It is revealed in the series finale that she does this so that he will one day become the President of the United States and use his position to help lower-class families like their own. His best friend is Stevie Kenarban. In the series finale, he graduates from high school and starts attending Harvard University by both scholarship and working various jobs, specifically as a janitor.
 Lois (played by Jane Kaczmarek) is the family's wildly hot-headed and stubborn mother who is also an intelligent and decisive woman. Most of her bullishness comes from her constant battles throughout the series to keep her badly behaved, highly destructive boys in check, while maintaining a menial job at a Lucky Aide drugstore, as well as her own difficult upbringing with a tyrannical mother. Though she is hard on her children for their constantly bad behavior, Lois can be just as petty and spiteful as them, e.g., going after a group of girls that humiliated Reese before his senior prom. Despite her constant aggressiveness, she is motherly and will defend her family fiercely, especially against neighbors and others who view them as poor trash; in one episode, she finds that Malcolm and Reese discovered their neighbor having an affair with her Hispanic gardener while they planned to frame her son for theft, but does not punish them for their actions as this counted as revenge against the woman, who despised Lois. Lois is disliked by both Hal's wealthy family and her own parents. She has a younger sister named Susan, who blames Lois for stealing Hal from her. Neighbors hate Lois and her sons and celebrate the weekends when they are gone. In the series finale, she discovered that she and Hal are expecting a sixth child.
 Hal (played by Bryan Cranston) is Lois' husband and father to Francis, Reese, Malcolm, Dewey and Jamie. Hal is a well-meaning, loving, but inept and completely immature father, and completely dependent on Lois, whom he loves absolutely. He comes from a wealthy family that does not accept Lois as his wife and who wish that he had married Susan instead. Because his family is disrespectful towards Lois, he rarely mentions them and avoids his family. Hal loves his boys and will sometimes sneak them out for fun father–son activities behind Lois' back. Hal is an indecisive character who frequently picks up new hobbies for short periods of time, such as speed walking or painting, and is irresponsible with the money he earns from his office job. His indecisiveness was explored in "Living Will" from a childhood which he had a hard time making decisions for himself and because of this, he always deferred to Lois to make them for him. In the series finale, he discovers that he and Lois are expecting a sixth child. Hal has a high sex drive, as revealed in the episode "Forbidden Girlfriend", and it is mentioned in the episode "Poker 2" that he has sex 14 times per week. Hal's best friend is Abe Kenarban.
 Francis (played by Christopher Kennedy Masterson) is Hal and Lois' first son. At the beginning of the series, he is attending military school in Alabama, run by the strict Commandant Spangler (Daniel von Bargen). It is shown that his parents enjoyed a promising middle-class, comfortable lifestyle before he was born and that he was such a difficult, destructive child that their dream soon ended. He has himself legally emancipated at the start of season three, leaves the school, and travels to Alaska. He finds work at a logging camp and later meets and marries Piama (Emy Coligado), a girl of Inuit heritage. When the camp closes, they move to the western United States and take jobs at a Wild West–themed hotel/ranch, run by kindly but eccentric Germans: Otto Mannkusser (played by Kenneth Mars) and his wife, Gretchen (played by Meagen Fay). Francis and his mother have a mutual love–hate war of wills, and his main motivation in life is to thwart or irk her (though, ironically, he marries a woman with the same personality as Lois). Although a juvenile delinquent, he is streetwise. Francis is seen less frequently after season five, becoming a recurring character and making only a small handful of appearances in season six and season seven, which is the show's final season. Francis' steady job disappears in season six due to legal issues until the series' finale, "Graduation", reveals that he already has a steady desk job sorting out computers. He admits to Hal that he likes his job, but also enjoys frustrating Lois by lying to her that he's unemployed.
 Reese (played by Justin Berfield) is Hal and Lois' second son. The older brother of Malcolm, Dewey and Jamie, and younger brother of Francis, Reese is the most impulsive and physical of the boys. Lacking common sense, he is frequently outwitted and outspoken by other family members, and is gleefully violent. Despite being dimwitted, Reese is able to devise plans thoroughly (although most of his plans tend to backfire), and is masterful at the rare tasks which can pin his drifting focus, such as driving, or cooking and baking (he's revealed to be a culinary prodigy). In the series finale, he finally graduates from high school after intentionally failing many times before, obtains full employment as a high school custodian, and shares an apartment with Craig.
 Dewey (played by Erik Per Sullivan) is Hal and Lois' fourth son. He is the youngest child until the birth of Jamie, and often falls victim to his brothers' pranks. Starting in season 4, Dewey is shown to be very intelligent and musically gifted as he begins teaching himself to play the piano. He has a very high tolerance for pain due to years of physical and mental abuse from his brothers. Dewey often resorts to Machiavellian schemes to one-up his brothers and parents. Despite his intelligence, he is placed in a remedial class for slower students (or "Buseys") due to a misunderstanding. Dewey remains in the class and serves as their self-appointed teacher. By the seventh and final season of the show, the Busey class is no longer mentioned. He is the only sibling that eventually breaks the cycle of abusing the younger sibling, which ends up with him acting like a normal, lovable brother towards Jamie. In the series finale, he and Jamie are last seen hiding in the closet together after a prank, continuing their older brothers' tradition of incurring Lois' wrath.

Episodes

Production

Development
The pilot was initially developed for UPN with Regency Television for the 1998–99 television season but when UPN's enthusiasm for the project waned, Gail Berman managed to rescue the pilot by bringing the project to Fox. The show was then moved to the 1999–2000 cycle where it was picked up by Fox.

Opening title
The show's opening title features short clips from cult films or television shows, edited together with clips from the pilot and early episodes of the show, set to the song "Boss of Me" by They Might Be Giants.

Filming

Much of the filming for Malcolm in the Middle was done on location in various parts of the thirty-mile zone around Los Angeles. A privately owned home, located in Studio City, California, was rented for upwards of $3,000 a day to film as the exterior of Malcolm's house. Rebuilt in 2011, the property is no longer recognizable due to its modern two-floor design. However, the house directly to the left of it is nearly identical to what it looked like during filming, still making it a frequent stop for fans of the show. Some high school scenes were filmed at Walter Reed Middle School, and the Lucky Aide was represented by a Drug Emporium at 6020 Lankershim Boulevard in North Hollywood. In "Stock Car Races", when Hal and the boys are entering a race track, the billboard behind the entrance displays the place as Irwindale Speedway, a real race track in Southern California. The last episode in the first season ("Water Park") was filmed at a water park called Wild Rivers located in Irvine, California. Though palm trees and desert scenery are seen in shots of the local region and town throughout the show, indicating a location in the Western United States, it is never revealed which state the show is set in (except for Francis' whereabouts in early seasons, such as his military school in Alabama and his job in Alaska).

Studio filming for Malcolm in the Middle took place on Stage 21 at CBS Studio Center in Studio City, which included the interior of the home and the back yard. The middle school play yard was at the northern point of the CBS studio property at the end of Radford Avenue. It was redressed as the high school courtyard starting in season 4 and was demolished in 2006–2007.

Hallmarks of the series' filming and structure, many of which heavily influenced later programs, included the following:

 A cold open presenting one or more family members in an absurd situation that has little or nothing to do with the main plot of the episode.
 A split-second whip pan as a transition from one scene to another.
 Frequent pieces to camera delivered by Malcolm.
 An abrupt cut to black at the end of each segment, accompanied by the sound of a slamming door.

During the final two seasons, Christopher Masterson reduced his on-screen time in favor of writing and directing some episodes.

Music
The show's theme song, "Boss of Me", was written and recorded by the alternative rock group They Might Be Giants. The song won the "Best Song Written for a Motion Picture, Television or Other Visual Media" award at the 2002 Grammy Awards. The band also performed nearly all of the incidental music for the show in its first two seasons.

Mood-setting music is sprinkled throughout the series, in lieu of audience laughter, in a way that resembles feature film more than other TV sitcoms. Some examples of this highly varied music include ABBA, Basement Jaxx, Sum 41, Kenny Rogers, Lemon Jelly, Lords of Acid, The Getaway People, En Vogue, Electric Light Orchestra, Fatboy Slim, Phil Collins, Claude Debussy, Tears for Fears, Quiet Riot, Queen, and Citizen King, whose song "Better Days" is played at the end of both the pilot episode and the series finale. The Southern California pop-punk band Lit have many of their songs featured in several episodes. Lit songs that were never released as singles were also used.

A soundtrack, Music from Malcolm in the Middle, was released on November 21, 2000.

Broadcast and syndication
The show entered barter syndication in the fall of 2004 one month before the sixth season premiered on Fox and was later aired on FX in the fall of 2007 until the fall of 2011.

The show was launched on Nick at Nite on July 5, 2009, at 8:00 pm with an all night marathon. However, the episodes were either skipped over or heavily edited due to content that was too strong for the network's standards. When Nick at Nite pulled Malcolm it began airing on TeenNick from November 26, 2010, and continued until December 2010. The show returned to TeenNick's line-up on July 18, 2011.

On September 26, 2011, Malcolm in the Middle began airing on IFC.
On March 5, 2018, the series began airing on Fuse.

On April 11, 2019, it was originally revealed that the show would be available on Disney+, Disney's direct-to-consumer streaming service, at launch on November 12, 2019. However, the show was not available on launch day for unknown reasons. In March 2020, during the COVID-19 pandemic, Disney sent a survey out to Disney+ consumers asking if they would like content on the site such as Malcolm in the Middle and other "mature" shows such as Firefly, Buffy the Vampire Slayer and Modern Family. The series is currently available to watch on Hulu and Amazon Prime Video.

In the United Kingdom, the series originally aired on Sky1 from September 3, 2000, later also airing on Sky2 and Sky3 before finally leaving all Sky channels in December 2010. It also aired on free-to-air BBC Two from April 6, 2001, to March 7, 2009. From January 3, 2011, it aired on Fiver (now 5*) at 6:00 pm and again at about 7:30 pm, later moving to a weekly slot at 3:15pm on Saturday afternoons. Repeats continued until January 18, 2014. Comedy Central UK and Ireland picked up the show in November 2015 and aired until 2018. Nickelodeon UK also began showing the series in 2018. 4Music started showing two episodes daily at 6.00pm and 6.30pm, from 6 July 2020. As of December 2021, the series is available on Disney+ in the UK.

Home media
Only the first season of Malcolm in the Middle has been released on DVD in the U.S. Season two was set to be released in the fall of 2003, but was cancelled due to high costs of music clearances.

In February 2012, it was announced that Fabulous Films would be releasing the first season of the show in the UK in April, as well as releasing each subsequent season the following month, ending with a complete series set near Christmas 2012. However, in late March 2012, several retailers had removed the release date from their websites; this was later revealed to be because of "technical issues with the Masters" and that the release date had been pushed back to June. Other seasons will now follow on either a monthly or bi-monthly basis.

All the UK DVD releases are intact as originally aired with no cuts, with the original music, with the exception of one season three episode "Company Picnic" which was originally aired as a one-hour special, before being re-edited and split into two parts for syndication. The DVD presents the syndicated version.

All seven seasons as well as the complete series set were released in Australia in September 2013. The complete series set altered the separate seven season sets to fit into four volumes. A collector's edition boxset which has the seasons split up instead of volumes was released subsequently in 2014. It features everything from the four-volume set and includes a bonus T-shirt. This set is exclusive to Australia.

In May 2019, Turbine Medien announced the first ever Blu-ray release of the complete series in Germany, that was released in September 2019. The release however, was in Standard Definition, in similar fashion to the PAL DVD releases.

Legacy 
The show is often regarded as influential as a family sitcom that was not filmed in front of a live studio audience and did not feature a laugh track, in addition to being praised for its single-camera filming style which would later be used in The Bernie Mac Show, The Office, Everybody Hates Chris, 30 Rock, and Arrested Development.

The series has been parodied on Family Guy multiple times.

In the 2017 film The Disaster Artist, Bryan Cranston appeared as himself, offering one of the protagonists a guest role on an episode of Malcolm in the Middle.

The series served as inspiration for episode 6 of the Disney+ Marvel Cinematic Universe television miniseries WandaVision, and the intro of WandaVision show in show also parodies Malcolm in the Middle. In episode 8 of the series, a DVD box of the first season can be seen among DVDs of other shows. Later in that same episode, the main characters are watching season seven's second episode "Health Insurance".

There is an alternate ending to Breaking Bad released on a DVD box set of the complete series, where Hal (whose actor Bryan Cranston plays Walter White in Breaking Bad) wakes up from a dream, revealing the entirety of Breaking Bad to be a bad dream in Malcolm in the Middle that Hal had after eating a deep-fried Twinkie. This is a parody of the ending to the show Newhart.

Reception
Season one holds a Metacritic score of 88 out of 100, based on 26 reviews, indicating "universal acclaim".

Ratings
The show started off with ratings of 23 million for the debut episode, and 26 million for the second episode.

Fox shuffled the show's air time repeatedly to make room for other shows. On January 13, 2006, Fox announced that the show would be moving to 7:00 pm on Sundays effective January 29, 2006. The 151st and final episode aired at 8:30 pm ET/PT (the show's original timeslot) on May 14, 2006. The finale was watched by 7.4 million.

Awards and nominations

Jane Kaczmarek and Cloris Leachman were nominated for a Primetime Emmy Award every year they appeared on the show, as leading and guest actress, respectively. Leachman won in 2002 and 2006. Frankie Muniz was nominated once for lead actor, and Bryan Cranston three times for supporting actor. The show won a total of 7 Emmys during its six-year run and a Peabody Award. Kaczmarek was nominated for three Golden Globe Awards, Muniz was nominated twice, and Cranston was nominated once.

Adaptation
Russian channel STS made a shot-for-shot adaptation called Супер Макс (Super Max) that comprises 1 season so far.

Possible revival
In 2016, Bryan Cranston openly expressed interest in doing a reunion. In 2021, Frankie Muniz, while speaking on Steve-O's podcast, revealed that Cranston was writing a script for a movie reunion and that the entire cast was ready to return except for one hold up, though he kept the identity confidential.

Notes

References

External links

 

 
2000 American television series debuts
2000s American single-camera sitcoms
2000s American sitcoms
2000s American teen sitcoms
2006 American television series endings
Emmy Award-winning programs
English-language television shows
Fox Broadcasting Company original programming
Peabody Award-winning television programs
Primetime Emmy Award-winning television series
Super Bowl lead-out shows
Television series about brothers
Television series about dysfunctional families
Television series about geniuses
Television series about teenagers
Television series by 20th Century Fox Television
Television shows filmed in California
Television shows set in the United States